Civic Center Drive is the name of a road in several areas including:

 Nevada State Route 607, portion of the road in North Las Vegas
 York Regional Road 65